The 2013–14 season will be MTK Budapest FC's 104th competitive season, 2nd consecutive season in the OTP Bank Liga and 125th year in existence as a football club.

First team squad

Transfers

Summer

In:

Out:

Winter

In:

Out:

List of Hungarian football transfers summer 2013
List of Hungarian football transfers winter 2013–14

Statistics

Appearances and goals
Last updated on 1 June 2014.

|-
|colspan="14"|Youth players:

|-
|colspan="14"|Out to loan:

|-
|colspan="14"|Players no longer at the club:

|}

Top scorers
Includes all competitive matches. The list is sorted by shirt number when total goals are equal.

Last updated on 1 June 2014

Disciplinary record
Includes all competitive matches. Players with 1 card or more included only.

Last updated on 1 June 2014

Overall
{|class="wikitable"
|-
|Games played || 43 (30 OTP Bank Liga, 7 Hungarian Cup and 6 Hungarian League Cup)
|-
|Games won || 17 (11 OTP Bank Liga, 4 Hungarian Cup and 2 Hungarian League Cup)
|-
|Games drawn || 10 (7 OTP Bank Liga, 2 Hungarian Cup and 1 Hungarian League Cup)
|-
|Games lost || 16 (12 OTP Bank Liga, 1 Hungarian Cup and 3 Hungarian League Cup)
|-
|Goals scored || 61
|-
|Goals conceded || 51
|-
|Goal difference || +10
|-
|Yellow cards || 83
|-
|Red cards || 3
|-
|rowspan="2"|Worst discipline ||  József Kanta (10 , 0 )
|-
|  Patrik Poór (10 , 0 )
|-
|rowspan="1"|Best result || 4–0 (A) v Újpest – OTP Bank Liga – 03-05-2014
|-
|rowspan="3"|Worst result || 0–3 (A) v Győr – OTP Bank Liga – 29-03-2014
|-
| 0–3 (A) v Kecskemét – OTP Bank Liga – 19-04-2014
|-
| 0–3 (A) v Újpest – Magyar Kupa – 06-05-2014
|-
|rowspan="1"|Most appearances ||  Dávid Kálnoki-Kis (37 appearances)
|-
|rowspan="1"|Top scorer ||  József Kanta (15 goals)
|-
|Points || 61/129 (47.29%)
|-

Nemzeti Bajnokság I

Matches

Classification

Results summary

Results by round

Hungarian Cup

League Cup

Group stage

Classification

Pre-season

References

External links
 Eufo
 Official Website
 UEFA
 fixtures and results

MTK Budapest FC seasons
Mtk Budapest